This is a list of dramatic television series (including web television and miniseries) that premiered in the 1960s–2000s which feature lesbian, gay, bisexual, and transgender characters. Non-binary, pansexual, asexual, and graysexual characters are also included. The orientation can be portrayed on-screen, described in the dialogue or mentioned.

1960s

1970s

1980s

1990s

1990

1991

1992

1993

1994

1995

1996

1997

1998

1999

2000s

2000

2001

2002

2003

2004

2005

2006

2007

2008

2009

See also

 List of fictional asexual characters
 List of fictional intersex characters
 List of fictional non-binary characters
 List of fictional pansexual characters
 List of animated series with LGBTQ+ characters
 List of comedy television series with LGBT characters
 List of horror television series with LGBT characters
 List of made-for-television films with LGBT characters
 List of news and information television programs featuring LGBT subjects
 List of reality television programs with LGBT cast members
 List of LGBT characters in radio and podcasts
 List of LGBT characters in soap operas

Citations

References

Further reading
 
 
 
 
GLAAD Primetime Television Season Reports

Dramatic television series 1960s-2000s
Dramatic
1960s in LGBT history
1970s in LGBT history
1980s in LGBT history
1990s in LGBT history
2000s in LGBT history
2010s in LGBT history
1960s in television
1970s in television
1980s in television
1990s in television
2000s in television
2010s in television